Dhund may refer to:

Dhund (tribe) (also Dhond) a tribe of northern Pakistan
Dhund (1973 film), a 1973 Indian film
Dhund (2003 film), a 2003 Indian film
Dhund (TV series), a Pakistani television series